The 2009–10 Biathlon World Cup - World Cup 2 is the second event of the season and was held in Hochfilzen, Austria from Friday December 11 until Sunday  December 13, 2009.

Schedule of events
The schedule of the event is below

Medal winners

Men

Women

Achievements
 Best performance for all time

, 3 place in Sprint
 , 18 place in Sprint
 , 34 place in Sprint
 , 39 place in Sprint
 , 41 place in Sprint
 , 42 place in Sprint
, 53 place in Sprint and 51 place in Pursuit
, 68 place in Sprint
, 82 place in Sprint
, 95 in Sprint
 , 15 place in Pursuit
 , 12 place in Sprint and  Pursuit
 , 13 place in Sprint and  Pursuit
 , 41 place in Sprint
 , 53 place in Sprint and 51 place in Pursuit
 , 54 place in Sprint  and 52 place in Pursuit
 , 69 place in Sprint
 , 88 place in Sprint
 , 95 place in Sprint
 , 108 place in Sprint
 , 27 place in Pursuit

 First World Cup race

 , 97 place in Sprint
 , 99 place in Sprint
 , 113 place in Sprint
 , 114 place in Sprint

References

- World Cup 2, 2009-10 Biathlon World Cup
2009 in Austrian sport
December 2009 sports events in Europe
Biathlon competitions in Austria
Sport in Tyrol (state)